John Goldsborough (31 July 1892 – 7 December 1952) was an English footballer who made 36 appearances in the Football League playing for Lincoln City as a goalkeeper. He went on to play for Boston Town, and in 1922 joined Llanelly as player/trainer. He later became Llanelly manager, in which role he was responsible for Jock Stein signing for the club in 1950.

To recognise 25 years service at Llanelly, a benefit match was held for him on 14 June 1947 which saw 12,000 spectators pack into Stebonheath Park to see Cardiff City beat an International XI captained by Billy Hughes. He resigned his post as manager in 1948 following a difference of opinion with the club's committee but was reappointed in May 1949. 

After leaving Llanelly, Goldsborough returned to his native Sheffield and lived in Woodhouse Mill. On 7 December 1952 he died in the Sheffield Royal Hospital; he was buried in Sheffield Woodhouse Cemetery on 11 December 1952.

References

1892 births
1952 deaths
Footballers from Sheffield
English footballers
Association football goalkeepers
Lincoln City F.C. players
Boston Town F.C. (1920s) players
Llanelli Town A.F.C. players
English Football League players
English football managers
Llanelli Town A.F.C. managers